The 2013–14 V-League season was the 10th season of the V-League, the highest professional volleyball league in South Korea. The season started on 2 November 2013 and finished on 5 April 2014. Daejeon Samsung Bluefangs were the defending champions in the men's league and Hwaseong IBK Altos the defending female champions.

Teams

Men's clubs

Women's clubs

Season standing procedure 
 Match points
 Number of matches won
 Sets ratio
 Points ratio
 Result of the last match between the tied teams

Match won 3–0 or 3–1: 3 match points for the winner, 0 match points for the loser
Match won 3–2: 2 match points for the winner, 1 match point for the loser

Regular season

League table (Male)

League table (Female)

Play-offs

Bracket (Male)

Bracket (Female)

Top Scorers

Men's

Women's

Player of the Round

Men's

Women's

Final standing

Men's League

Women's League

References

External links
 Official website 

2013 in volleyball
2014 in volleyball
V-League (South Korea)